Don Ángel de Saavedra y Ramírez de Baquedano, 3rd Duke of Rivas (10 March 179122 June 1865) was a Spanish poet, dramatist and politician born in Córdoba.  He is best known for his play Don Álvaro o la fuerza del sino (Don Álvaro, or the Force of Fate) (1835), the first romantic success in the Spanish theater.

Career
De Saavedra fought in the war of independence and was also a prominent member of the advanced Liberal party from 1820 to 1823.  In 1823, Rivas was condemned to death for his liberal views and fled to England.  He lived successively in Italy, Malta and France, until the death of Ferdinand VII in 1833 and the amnesty of 1834, when he returned to Spain, shortly afterwards succeeding his brother as duke of Rivas.

In 1835 he became minister of the interior under Isturiz, and along with his chief had again to leave the country. Returning in 1837, he joined the moderate party, became prime minister, and was subsequently ambassador at Paris and Naples and director of the Real Academia Española.

In 1813 he published Ensayos poéticos, and between that time and his first exile several of his tragedies (the most notable being Alatar, 1814, and Lanuza, 1822) were put upon the stage. Traces of foreign influence are observable in El Moro expósito (1833), a narrative poem dedicated to John Hookham Frere; these are still more marked in Don Álvaro o la fuerza del sino (first played on 22 March 1835 in Madrid), a drama which emerged from heated literary controversy.

Don Álvaro is of historical importance inasmuch as it established the new French romanticism in Spain. The play was used as the basis of Francesco Maria Piave's libretto for Verdi's opera La forza del destino (1862).  As a poet, Rivas's best-known work is Romances históricos (1841), adaptions of popular legends in ballad form.

Marriage and children 
He married María de la Encarnación de Cueto y Ortega (1806–1885) and had 9 children, including : 
 Enrique Ramírez de Saavedra y de Cueto (1828–1914), 4th Duke of Rivas
 Gonzalo de Saavedra y Cueto (1831–1899), mayor of Madrid

References

Bibliography
Duque de Rivas, Obras completas (Madrid 1956).
R. Cardwell, "Don Álvaro or the Force of Cosmic Injustice" in Studies in Romanticism 12 (1973): 559–79.
D. T. Gies The Theater in Nineteenth-Century Spain (Cambridge 1994).
G. H. Lovett, The Duke of Rivas (Boston 1977).
W. T. Pattison, "The secret of Don Álvaro" in Symposium 21 (1967): 67–81.
J. Valero and S. Zighelboim, "Don Álvaro o la fuerza del signo" in Decimononica 3 (2006): 53–71.

External links
Don Álvaro, or the Force of Fate (description of English translation by Robert G. Trimble)

 

1791 births
1865 deaths
People from Córdoba, Spain
103
Prime Ministers of Spain
Rosicrucians
Spanish male writers
Members of the Royal Spanish Academy
Moderate Party (Spain) politicians
19th-century Spanish politicians
Knights of the Golden Fleece of Spain